Strophocactus brasiliensis, synonym Pseudoacanthocereus brasiliensis, is a species of plant in the family Cactaceae. It is endemic to Brazil. Its natural habitats are subtropical or tropical dry forests and hot deserts. It is threatened by habitat loss.

Description
Strophocactus brasiliensis grows as a shrub, initially upright and later sprawling. It branches freely. They open at night. The fruits are yellow when ripe.

Taxonomy
Strophocactus brasiliensis was first described, as Acanthocereus brasiliensis, by Britton and Rose in 1920. It was transferred to the genus Pseudoacanthocereus as Pseudoacanthocereus brasiliensis by Friedrich Ritter in 1979, a placement still accepted by some sources . A molecular phylogenetic study of the Hylocereeae by Korotkova et al. published in 2017 showed that Pseudoacanthocereus brasiliensis formed a clade with Strophocactus wittii and Pseudoacanthocereus sicariguensis (the only other species placed in Pseudoacanthocereus):

Accordingly, both species of Pseudoacanthocereus were transferred to Strophocactus.

Distribution and habitat
Strophocactus brasiliensis is native to Northeast and Southeast Brazil. It is found in the eastern caatinga ecoregion, an area of thorn scrub and seasonally dry forests.

References

Echinocereeae
Cacti of South America
Endemic flora of Brazil
Taxonomy articles created by Polbot
Plants described in 1920
Taxobox binomials not recognized by IUCN